Economic base may refer to :

Economic base analysis, a theory in regional economics which posits that activities in an area divide into two categories, basic and nonbasic
The base, one of the two parts of capitalist society in marxist theory

Economics disambiguation pages